Derovo - Derivados de ovos, S.A. is a Portugal-based company headquartered in Pombal and founded in 1994, specialized in the production of pasteurized egg products, in the production of boiled eggs, in the production of Fullprotein (protein drink - world's first egg-white-based drink), and develops egg-based products to the needs of its customers, targeted at various markets such as food industries, pastries, bakeries and confectionery. It has the Certification and Quality Control ISO 9001:2000; and HACCP – Food Safety. Derovo is currently present in Portugal, Spain, France and Angola. Among its awards are Egg Products Company of the Year Award by the IEC - International Egg Commission (2002); Medalha de Mérito Industrial by the Câmara Municipal de Pombal (2002); Prémio Internacionalização by Gesventure (2004); Certificate of Fullprotein as Selected Trends & Innovations in the Sial – Global Food Marketplace (2006); Toféu Afonso Lopes Vieira as the best Company by the Local Newspaper Região de Leiria (2007).

References

External links
Official site

Food manufacturers of Portugal
Food and drink companies established in 1994
1994 establishments in Portugal
Eggs (food)